Michael Sheridan (1896 – 6 July 1970) was an Irish Fianna Fáil politician. A farmer, he was first elected to Dáil Éireann as a Fianna Fáil Teachta Dála (TD) for the Cavan constituency at the 1932 general election. He was re-elected at each subsequent general election until 1961, when he retired from politics.

References

1896 births
1970 deaths
Fianna Fáil TDs
Irish farmers
Members of the 7th Dáil
Members of the 8th Dáil
Members of the 9th Dáil
Members of the 10th Dáil
Members of the 11th Dáil
Members of the 12th Dáil
Members of the 13th Dáil
Members of the 14th Dáil
Members of the 15th Dáil
Members of the 16th Dáil
Politicians from County Cavan